Cocula is one of the 81 municipalities of Guerrero, in south-western Mexico. The municipal seat lies at Cocula. The municipality covers an area of 339.2 km².

As of 2005, the municipality had a total population of 13,884.

References

Municipalities of Guerrero